Stephanie Turner is an American actress and filmmaker. Turner wrote, directed, produced, and starred in the 2019 Netflix film Justine, about a recent widow who becomes a caretaker to a child with spina bifida.

Early life and education
Turner is originally from Long Beach, California. She spent her early life in the Dallas, Texas, area. When she was ten years old, her family moved to the Washington, D.C., area. Turner attended Oakton High School before finishing high school in San Diego. After graduating from high school, Turner studied acting at Baron Brown Studio in Santa Monica.

Acting and film making career
Turner had roles in the movie Monster-in-Law as well as television series including 7th Heaven, Dirt, and CSI: NY.

In 2013, Turner began writing the script for Justine, a film about a newly widowed woman who becomes the caretaker for a girl with spina bifida. Turner and her husband started their own production company, Football Brat Productions, in order to produce the film. Justine, which stars Turner, Daisy Prescott, Darby Stanchfield, Glynn Turman, and Josh Stamberg, premiered at the Newport Beach Film Festival in 2019. Justine was distributed by Ava DuVernay's company Array. The film, which Turner wrote, directed, starred in, and produced, was favorably reviewed by The New York Times.

Personal life
Turner is the daughter of National Football League coach Norv Turner. One of her brothers is football coach Scott Turner. Turner is married and has two children.

References

External links
 

Living people
21st-century American actresses
American film actresses
People from Long Beach, California
American women film directors
American women film producers
Year of birth missing (living people)